This is a list of seasons completed by the Western Michigan University Broncos men's ice hockey team. 

Western Michigan has made seven NCAA men's ice hockey tournaments. 

* Winning percentage is used when conference schedules are unbalanced.
† Bill Wilkinson was fired as coach in February 1999 due to NCAA violations regarding player compensation.

Footnotes

References

 
Lists of college men's ice hockey seasons in the United States
Western Michigan Broncos ice hockey seasons